Carter Beckworth (born 1986 in Houston, Texas) is an American singer-songwriter and musician who resides in Santa Fe, New Mexico and is known for his unique style, combining rock, R&B and electronic elements.  He has released five solo albums since 2007, and he is also the lead vocalist of the rock band Baker Hotel, with whom he has released two albums.

Early career 

Beckworth has been writing songs and singing since the age of 12. He started playing professionally when he was a student at the University of Mississippi in Oxford, Mississippi.  It was here that he released his debut solo album, Fairweather Grace, in 2007.
Beckworth returned to Texas to attend St. Edward's University. After a year, Beckworth transferred to University of Texas at Austin where he graduated in 2010 with a degree in English and a minor in Spanish.  He later took a job as a fishing guide in Alaska, and performed his music for the guests at the lodge where he worked.

Beckworth's name is known to fans of the hit single, "Mabel," which played on over 200 radio stations and was selected to appear in two independent films.

Baker Hotel 

While Beckworth was in Austin from 2008 until he graduated from UT Austin in 2010, he studied full-time and also performed as frontman for the rock band Baker Hotel, whose sound was called reminiscent of ground-breakers like Pearl Jam, ZZ Top, and Guns N' Roses.
The band released two albums – Baker Hotel (Independent) in 2008 and Hard To Prove (Revolution Records) in 2010.

Touring 

Beckworth has toured in more than 30 states around the United States and Canada, and has shared the stage with performers such as Randy Rogers Band, Carolyn Wonderland, Bob Schneider, Bruce Robison, Black Oak Arkansas, Mike McClure, Micky & the Motorcars, Ryan Bingham, Hayes Carll, Cory Morrow and Pat Green, as well as noted country musician Radney Foster.

Songwriting 

As a songwriter, Beckworth writes almost all of his own material, and contributed six songs  to Texas music star Cory Morrow's 2015 album 'The Good Fight.'

Discography

Albums

See also 

 Music of Austin

References

External links 

 , official website
 
 

1986 births
Living people
American rock musicians
American rock songwriters
Musicians from Houston
American rock singers
21st-century American male singers
21st-century American singers
American male singer-songwriters
Singer-songwriters from Texas